"Runaway" is a song by Linkin Park. It is the sixth track from their debut album, Hybrid Theory. The song was also remixed for their first remix album Reanimation, titled "Rnw@y". The song was written by the band and Mark Wakefield. A 1998 demo of the song, titled as "Stick and Move" (which was originally titled as "Stick N Move" that appeared on Xero's 4-track sampler tape Xero in 1996), was released on the band's ninth Linkin Park Underground extended play LP Underground 9.0. It is one of three songs on Hybrid Theory to have been written by the band's original lead vocalist, Mark Wakefield.

Music and live performances
It is one of the few songs on Hybrid Theory to contain unusually little rapping by Mike Shinoda, just like "Crawling".

During live performances, two constant changes occur. Firstly, drummer Rob Bourdon performs a snare roll just before the second verse. Finally, during the second verse vocalist Chester Bennington alters the line "guilty by association" to "you're all guilty by association" while waving his arm to the audience. Both can be evidenced on Live in Texas and The Family Values Tour 2001 CD's. "Runaway" was a staple in live performances even before Hybrid Theory, and was omitted in 2006 until the first leg of the Living Things Tour in 2012.

Critical reception
David Fricke of Rolling Stone noted the "tumbling funk" of Bourdon in the song, as well as the way that Shinoda and Bennington "shoot and share rhymes ... their bodies rocking with spasms of conviction." Writing of Linkin Park's remixing of the track for their album Reanimation, David Browne of Entertainment Weekly called "Rnw@y" "more sonically expansive" than the original version had been. He wrote that "Rnw@y" (along with a few others on the album) made Linkin Park sound like "experimental DJs."

Charts
"Runaway" charted in the United States during the height of Hybrid Theory's popularity.

References

2000 songs
Linkin Park songs
Songs written by Mike Shinoda
Songs written by Brad Delson
Songs written by Chester Bennington